Sadeqabad (also Romanized as Şādeqābād; also known as Sadeq Abad Pishkooh, Şādeqābād Pīshkūh, and Sādiqābād) is a village in Dehshir Rural District, in the Central District of Taft County, Yazd Province, Iran. At the 2006 census, its population was 27, in 8 families.

References 

Populated places in Taft County